The Emblem of Iraq since the rule of Baathism features a golden black eagle looking towards the viewer's left dexter. The eagle is the Eagle of Saladin associated with 20th-century pan-Arabism, bearing a shield of the Iraqi flag, and holding a scroll below with the Arabic words جمهورية العراق (Jumhuriyet Al-`Iraq or "Republic of Iraq").

The emblem has been modified three times, in 1991, 2004, and 2008.

Symbols used in ancient Mesopotamia

Assyria 

During the Assyrian Empire, which is by many researchers regarded to have been the first world empire in history. At its height, the empire was the strongest military power in the world and ruled over all of Mesopotamia, the Levant and Egypt, as well as portions of Anatolia, Arabia and modern-day Iran and Armenia. 

For this reason, the Assyrians used heavily the imperial propaganda and proclaimed the supremacy of Ashur and declared that the conquered peoples had been abandoned by their own gods. Ashur was represented as the winged sun that appears frequently in Assyrian iconography. Many Assyrian kings had names that included the name Ashur, including, above all, Ashur-uballit I, Ashurnasirpal, Esarhaddon (Ashur-aha-iddina), and Ashurbanipal. Epithets include bêlu rabû "great lord", ab ilâni "father of gods",  šadû rabû "great mountain", and il aššurî "god of Ashur" 

There are also two heads—a lion's and a man's—with gaping mouths, which may symbolize tempests, the destroying power of the sun, or the sources of the Tigris and Euphrates.  winged disc is regarded as "the purer and more genuine symbol of Ashur as a solar deity". And is sometimes called "a sun disc with protruding rays",  while  the other symbol where the warrior with the bow and arrow was added—is regarded as a despiritualization that reflects the martial spirit of the Assyrian empire".

Babylonia 

During the Babylonian Empire, symbols continued to be heavily used to represent the Empire while also for imperial propaganda purposes. Among these

are Lion of Babylon symbol alongside Shamash, often represented on poles as a standard from the Akkadian period down to the Neo-Babylonian period.

Modern

1921-1959 
Following the Mandate for Mesopotamia and the establishment of Kingdom of Iraq, the coat of arms of the Hashemite Kingdom of Iraq represented the Kingdom's ancient history during Pre-Islamic times, as well as during Post-islamic times.Symbolizing the monarchy of the Hashemite Kingdom of Iraq, the golden crown is composed of five arches with beaded design, fanning out from beneath its pinnacle and attached to the base with a relief design recalling rubies and emeralds. The crown is adorned at the top by the tip of a spear that represents the Hashemite banner.

The crown rests on a royal mantle, which signifies sacrifice and purity. The mantle is trimmed in a fringe of golden threads and gathered on either side with golden tasselled cords to reveal a white silk lining.

Two stars are above the central shield on either sides. Each star represents Ishtar and Shamash.

The shield's dexter supporter is the Lion of Babylon, the sinister supporter is an Arabian horse, both traditional symbols of the power of the king.

The shield in the centre shows a depiction of the land Mesopotamia. They depict the two rivers Euphrates and Tigris flowing through the desert, and their confluence at the Shatt al-Arab. At the confluence is a tree at the rivers banks, which symbolises the largest date palm forest in the world that used to be there. Underneath the tree over the rivers are a scimitar and a spear, to depict defense of the land. Around the shield at the top are in Kufic script "Kingdom of Iraq" and underneath the year of independence 1932.

Underneath the shield are gold wheat ears and a palm frond.

1959-1965 
The first post-monarchical state emblem of Iraq adopted under the republican government of Abd al-Karim Qasim was based on the ancient sun-disk symbol of Shamash and Ishtar, and avoided pan-Arab symbolism by incorporating elements of Socialist heraldry. 

At the time of the Iraqi Revolution of 1958, Qassim had demonstrated strong pan-Arab and Arab nationalist views, however, these cooled somewhat during his presidency.

Law No.57 of 1959 titled "Emblem of the Iraq Republic" and Article 1, "Description of the Emblem" state:

1965-present 
The overthrow of Qasim's government by the Ba'ath Party in 1963 marked an increase in pan-Arab sympathies, a change which was demonstrated in the new national flag based on that of the United Arab Republic (UAR). The new Iraqi coat of arms was similarly based on that of the UAR, namely the Eagle of Saladin, which had become a symbol of Arab nationalism following the Egyptian Revolution of 1952. Indeed, the only difference between the two coat of arms was the presence of three green stars in the vertical white band on the eagle's shield, as opposed to the two stars of the UAR, and the specific Arabic script in the scroll under the eagle's feet bearing the name of the official name state.

This version of the coat of arms remained in use until it was modified in January 1991, concurrently with the addition of the Takbir between the green stars on the flag of Iraq. To permit the Takbir to appear on the same line on the shield on the coat of arms, it was decided to make the bands on the shield horizontal instead of vertical. Of the six Arab states that are, or who have previously used the Eagle of Saladin in their coat of arms, post 1991-Iraq is the only state whose coat of arms has its national flag appearing horizontally rather than vertically on the shield.

In 2004, following the U.S. invasion and occupation of Iraq, the U.S. appointed Iraqi interim administration modified the Takbir on both the flag and the coat of arms, rendering it in Kufic script.

In 2008, concurrent with the removal of the three green stars from the Iraqi flag, the stars were removed from the coat of arms, leaving only the Takbir in the central white band.

See also 
Iraqi nationalism
Flag of Iraq
Ashur
Shamash
Lamassu
Lion of Babylon
Star of Ishtar
Eagle of Saladin

References

Sources

External links 

Iraq
National symbols of Iraq
Iraq
Iraq